A stripper is a performer of striptease, a type of exotic or erotic dance.

Stripper may also refer to:
Stripper (chemistry), reactor used for removing gas from a liquid
Air stripper, one such apparatus
Paint stripper, chemical for removing paint
Stripper (printing), person who joins film negatives in plate preparation
Stripper clip, a firearm accessory
Stripper (agriculture), type of harvesting machine
Stripper (tool), used for removing air from medical tubing
Wire stripper, used for removing insulation from electrical wire

Entertainment
 The Stripper, instrumental piece by David Rose
 The Stripper (film), 1963 film
 The Stripper (TV series), Brazilian TV series
 Stripper (film), 1986 documentary of a female stripper's convention
 "Stripper", song from First Album (Miss Kittin & The Hacker album)
 Stripper (song), 2022 song by Achille Lauro